Alo Jakin (born November 14, 1986) is an Estonian cyclist and coach, who currently rides for Estonian amateur team Peloton. Jakin rode professionally between 2006 and 2007 and from 2014 to 2019; in his final professional season, Jakin won his second Estonian National Road Race Championships title and also won a silver medal in the road race at the European Games.

Major results

2010
 9th Tallinn–Tartu GP
2011
 5th Tallinn–Tartu GP
 6th Grand Prix de la ville de Nogent-sur-Oise
 8th La Roue Tourangelle
 10th Grand Prix des Marbriers
2013
 1st Stage 3 Ronde de l'Oise
 9th Overall Tour of Estonia
2014
 National Road Championships
1st  Road race
2nd Time trial
2015
 1st Boucles de l'Aulne
 3rd Overall Four Days of Dunkirk
 3rd Grand Prix de la Somme
 9th Grand Prix de la ville de Pérenchies
2016
 1st Stage 4 Circuit des Ardennes
 3rd Road race, National Road Championships
2017
 2nd Road race, National Road Championships
 5th Route Adélie
 10th La Drôme Classic
2018
 2nd Time trial, National Road Championships
 7th Overall Tour of Estonia
 8th Overall Boucles de la Mayenne
2019
 1st  Road race, National Road Championships
 2nd  Road race, European Games
2020
 2nd Overall Baltic Chain Tour
1st Stage 1
2021
 3rd Road race, National Road Championships

References

External links

1986 births
Living people
Sportspeople from Tartu
Estonian male cyclists
European Games silver medalists for Estonia
European Games medalists in cycling
Cyclists at the 2019 European Games